commonly referred to as Pioneer, is a Japanese multinational corporation based in Tokyo, that specializes in digital entertainment products. The company was founded by Nozomu Matsumoto in January 1, 1938 in Tokyo as a radio and speaker repair shop. Its current president is Susumu Kotani.

Pioneer played a role in the development of interactive cable TV, the LaserDisc player, the first automotive Compact Disc player, the first detachable face car stereo, Supertuner technology, DVD and DVD recording, the first AV receiver with Dolby Digital, plasma display (with the last 2 years of plasma models being branded as Kuro, lauded for their outstanding black levels) and Organic LED display (OLED). The company works with optical disc and display technology and software products and is also a manufacturer. BMW, Volkswagen Group and Daimler AG of Germany jointly acquired a 3% ownership stake in Pioneer through a joint venture company called Here B.V. Most of Pioneer's shares are held by Mitsubishi.

In March 2010, Pioneer stopped producing televisions as announced on 12 February 2009. On June 25, 2009, Sharp Corporation agreed to form a joint venture on their optical business to be called Pioneer Digital Design and Manufacturing Corporation. In September 2014, Pioneer agreed to sell Pioneer Home Electronics (Home A/V) to Onkyo, and in March 2015, Pioneer sold its DJ equipment business division to KKR, which resulted in the establishment of Pioneer DJ as a separate entity, independent of Pioneer. In June 2021, Voxx International announced that it had finalized a licensing agreement with the Pioneer and Pioneer Elite brands "for all markets, except China" as part of their acquisition of Onkyo.

Timeline

 1937: Pioneer's founder, Nozomu Matsumoto develops the A-8 dynamic speaker.
 January 1938: Fukuin Shokai Denki Seisakusho (precursor of Pioneer) is founded in Tokyo.
 May 1947: Fukuin Denki is incorporated.
 December 1953: Hi-Fi Speaker PE-8 introduced.
 June 1961: Company name changed to Pioneer Electronic Corporation.
 October 1961: Shares are listed on the Tokyo Stock Exchange Second Section.
 June 1962: Introduces the world's first separate stereo system.
 March 1966: Establishes sales companies in Europe and the U.S.
 February 1968: Shares are listed on the Tokyo Stock Exchange First Section.
 April 1968: Shares are listed on the Osaka Securities Exchange.
 February 1969: Shares are listed on the Amsterdam Stock Exchange (now Euronext Amsterdam). U.S. GAAP consolidated financial reporting starts
 November 11, 1970: Establishes Warner Bros.-Pioneer Corporation with Warner Bros. Records and Watanabe Productions, becoming a new Japanese distributor of Warner Bros. Records releases.
 August 1971: Introduces the HiPac cartridge format
 1972: Warner Bros.-Pioneer Corp. changes its name to Warner-Pioneer Corporation and extends its distribution to catalogs of Atlantic Records, Reprise Records, Elektra Records and Asylum Records, along with other labels owned by WEA.
 1973: Introduces the reel to reel recorder RT-1020L
 November 1975: Introduces the world's first component car stereo.
 1976: Hi-Fi Speaker HPM-100 introduced.
 December 1976: Shares are listed on the New York Stock Exchange.
 December 1977: Introduces the world's first two-way addressable CATV system in the U.S. (with Warner Cable).
 1978: Introduces SX-1980 receiver, Pioneer's most powerful receiver manufactured to date.
 February 1979: Introduces the industry-use Laserdisc player.
 June 1980: Introduces VP-1000 LD player for home use in the U.S.
 March 1981: Warner-Pioneer Corp. establishes the LaserDisc Corporation in Japan.
 October 1981: Introduces LD player for home use and 70 LD software titles in Japan.
 October 1982: Introduces the LD Karaoke system for business use.
 November 1982: Introduces CD player.
 September 1984: Introduces the world's first LD combination player compatible with CDs and LDs.
 October 1984: Releases the world's first car CD player.
 December 1985: Introduces the 40-inch projection monitor.
 1989: LaserDisc Corporation changes its name to Pioneer LDC.
 June 1990: Introduces the world's first CD-based GPS automotive navigation system.
 1990: Warner-Pioneer Corp. dissolves after Pioneer's shares were bought by Warner Music Group. Shortly after the company renamed Warner Music Japan Inc. under which is active today.
 1990: Pioneer invests in motion picture production company Carolco Pictures
 June 1992: Pioneer establishes its regional subsidiary in Southeast Asia, Pioneer Electronics AsiaCentre Pte. Ltd.
 October 1992: Introduces the world's first 4x CD-ROM changer.
 1993: Pioneer acquires a 50% investment in Live Entertainment from Carolco Pictures
 1993: Pioneer establishes Pioneer Entertainment in the U.S. as the American division of Pioneer LDC.
 April 1995: Pioneer writes off $90 million of losses from its investment in Carolco and Live.
 June 1996:
 Tokorozawa Plant earns ISO 14001 certification.
 Pioneer inaugurates and launches Pioneer Karaoke Channel, an Astro satellite television channel for music video and karaoke programming consists for nightclubs.
 December 1996: Introduces DVD/CD player and the world's first DVD/LD/CD compatible player for home use.
 May 1997: Starts supplying digital satellite broadcast set-top boxes in Europe.
 June 1997: Introduces the world's first DVD-based GPS automotive navigation system.
 October 1997: Introduces the world's first DVD-R drive.
 November 1997: Introduces the world's first OEL-equipped car audio product.
 December 1997: Introduces the world's first high definition 50-inch plasma display for consumer use.
 June 1998: Introduces the world's first DVD-based GPS automotive navigation system featuring 8.5GB dual-layered DVD.
 January 1999: Introduces new corporate logo.
 April 1999: Starts supplying digital CATV set-top boxes in the U.S.
 June 1999: English company name changed to Pioneer Corporation.
 December 1999: Introduces the world's first DVD recorder compatible with the DVD-RW format.
 March 2000: Shares of Tohoku Pioneer are listed on the Tokyo Stock Exchange Second Section.
 June 2001: Introduces hard disk-based GPS automotive navigation system.
 July 2001: Introduces the global brand slogan "sound.vision.soul".
 November 2002: Introduces GPS automotive navigation system with a wireless communication module.
 November 2002: Introduces a DVD recorder with hard disk.
 March 2003: Introduces in the U.S. digital CATV settop boxes with high definition TV signal reception capability.
 July 2003: Pioneer LDC is acquired by Dentsu.
 September 2003: Total shipment worldwide of PC-use recordable DVD drives surpasses 5 million units.
 October 1, 2003: Pioneer LDC is renamed Geneon Entertainment and Pioneer Entertainment is renamed Geneon USA.
 July 2004: Introduces the Pioneer DVJ-X1, the world's first DVD player for professional DJs and VJs.
 Circa August 2004: Introduces DVR-108, first 16× DVD burning optical disc drive
 October 1, 2004: Pioneer Plasma Display Corporation (previously NEC Plasma Display Corporation) starts operation.
 January 2006: President Kaneo Ito and Chairman Kanya Matsumoto, son of the company's founder, leave their posts to take responsibility for the recent poor performance of the maker of DVD recorders and plasma TVs. Vice President Tamihiko Sudo is appointed the new president, effective from January 1 by the board of directors.
 December 2006: Pioneer closes its car audio division in Singapore.
 July 2008: Pioneer develops 16-layer Blu-ray Disc capable of storing 400 GB.
 November 2009: Pioneer moves its head office from Tokyo to Kawasaki.
 September 2009: Pioneer announce two new players to their DJ equipment portfolio, the CDJ-900 and CDJ-2000. 
 March 2010: Pioneer stops producing TVs.
 May 2010: Pioneer releases two new DJ software controllers, the DDJ-S1, and the DDJ-T1.
 May 2011: Pioneer announces the release of the Smart Concept Car with a full DJ setup.
 October 2011: Pioneer officially released a new 2-channel DJ controller called the DDJ-ERGO at the BPM Show 2011.
 May 2012 – Pioneer introduced Cyber Navi AR-HUD, the world's first automotive navigation system head up display (HUD) to project augmented reality (AR) using laser beam scanning technology developed by MicroVision, Inc.
 August 2012: Pioneer officially launches the XDJ-AERO, Pioneer's first wireless DJ system that plays music from smartphones and tablets via Wi-Fi.
 April 2013: Pioneer officially launches the DJM-750.
 September 2014: Pioneer would sell its disc-jockey equipment business to private equity firm KKR for about 59 billion yen($550 million).
 March 2016: Pioneer moves its head office from Kawasaki to Tokyo.
September 2018: after Pioneer became heavily indebted following its failed forays into car navigation and audio systems, Baring Private Equity Asia injected the company with 60 billion yen ($540 million), allowing Pioneer to settle some of their outstanding bank loans.
March 2019: Pioneer delists from the Tokyo Stock Exchange to focus on debt restructuring, after the bailout was accepted following an extraordinary shareholder meeting.

Brands and devices

 Pioneer – car electronics
 Pioneer Elite produces premium electronics that are usually higher in quality and price. Most Pioneer Elite branded electronics have the gloss black "Urushi" finish.
 Pioneer Elite products include AVRs, Laserdisc players, CD players, DVD players, plasma computer monitors and televisions [Now discontinued], and rear-projection televisions. Pioneer Elite debuted their first Blu-ray Disc player, the BDP-HD1, in January 2007. Pioneer released the first 1080p plasma display, the PRO-FHD1.
 In Summer of 2007, Pioneer released the Kuro line of plasma displays, that the company claims has the best black levels of any flat panel display which leads to greater contrast, and more realistic images. Kuro means black in Japanese.
 Pioneer Cycle Sport – GPS bicycle computers and single/dual-sided crankset-based power meters.
 Carrozzeria (Japan only) – car electronics
 Pioneer Premier (North America only) – high-end car electronics [Now discontinued]
 TAD – Technical Audio Devices. Primarily noted as a manufacturer of high-efficiency audio loudspeaker components and complete speaker systems for the commercial sound reinforcement and recording studio markets. The base for US operations is located in southern California, with limited design/manufacturing done on site. Operations commenced in the early 1980s and continue to this day with a limited offering of speaker components and expanded the offering of consumer speakers and electronics.
 Pioneer DJ – DJ equipment. A 85.05 percent majority stake of the brand was sold to private equity firm KKR in 2015 for 59 billion yen ($551 million), but KKR resold it yet again to photo processing machine manufacturer Noritsu in March 2020 for 35 billion yen ($324.9 million).
Pioneer Premium Audio- a brand of factory-installed OEM premium sound systems for GM vehicles: Chevrolet Cobalt, Chevrolet Cruze, Chevrolet Malibu, Chevrolet Equinox, GMC Terrain, Pontiac G5, and Pontiac Torrent as seven-speaker premium sound systems, and a premium sound system for the Ford Ranger, Honda Ridgeline, and Mazda B-Series compact pickup trucks.

Pioneer also supplies genuine audio equipments and head units installed for Daihatsu automobiles marketed in Indonesia since the launch of Daihatsu Xenia in 2004.

Pioneer Karaoke Channel 

Pioneer Karaoke Channel is a satellite television channel that features Asian music videos and karaoke 24 hours a day. Pioneer and Malaysian satellite broadcaster Astro officially launched on 1 June 1996.

Subsidiary
Sanken Argadwija (Sanken Electronics Indonesia)
Vitron Electronic Industry (Vitron Electronics Indonesia)

Slogan, Motto and Tagline
The Art of Entertainment

Devices 

The GPS device Pioneer Avic, includes TMC features.

Optical drives 

Pioneer is one of the major vendors of optical drives.

Operation modes 
More recent optical drives allow the user to specify different operation modes using bundled software:

 "Entertainment Mode” – Reduction of acoustic drive noise
 "High-performance Mode" – Prioritizes reading and writing speeds
 “Quality Mode” – Prioritizes reading and writing accuracy
 “Eco Mode” – Minimizes power consumption

See also 

 Car audio and universal steering wheel control interface
 CDJ
 Automotive navigation system
 List of Japanese companies
 List of phonograph manufacturers
 Geneon (formerly Pioneer LDC and its North American subsidiary Pioneer Entertainment, the multimedia production arm of Pioneer Corporation)
 DVJ-X1
 List of music software
 List of studio monitor manufacturers

References

Sources
 Pioneer HPM-100,  Advertisement. 1976: 1-4.
 40-inch Projection Monitor has been seen in Switzerland on second hand sales

External links

 
Japanese companies established in 1938
Audio amplifier manufacturers
Compact Disc player manufacturers
Companies based in Kanagawa Prefecture
Companies listed on the Tokyo Stock Exchange
Consumer electronics brands
Display technology companies
Electronics companies established in 1938
Defunct defense companies of Japan
Headphones manufacturers
In-car entertainment
Japanese brands
Loudspeaker manufacturers
Manufacturing companies established in 1938
Microphone manufacturers
Multinational companies headquartered in Japan
Navigation system companies
Phonograph manufacturers
Sharp Corporation divisions and subsidiaries
Technology companies established in 1938